"Le ballet" (meaning "The Ballet") is a French-language song by Canadian singer Celine Dion, recorded for her French album, D'eux (1995). It was released as a promotional single in France in January 1996 and became immediately a huge radio hit topping the Airplay Chart and ranking as the sixth most economically profitable song of 1996 in France.

Background and release
"Le ballet" is a bluesy groove song, with percussive finger snaps, harmonica and electric guitar that shows Dion singing blues for first time. The song is an example of D'eux style that was influenced by continental pop, folk music, jazz and 1970s soul. Written and produced by Jean-Jacques Goldman this track is considered an example of Goldman's handling of mature topics and feelings and is known for Dion's imitations of instruments. Starting in her D'eux Tour in 1995, and featured on the Live à Paris album, she used an extended version of this song to introduce all her band members. She performed the song similarly on her Falling Into You Around the World Tour. The song was also performed in Dion's European concerts in 2017. "Le ballet" was included as the B-side of "Falling into You" single, released later. It was also featured on some editions of Dion's greatest hits compilation On ne change pas in 2005.

Commercial performance
"Le ballet" entered the Airplay Chart in France on 27 January 1996 and topped it for two weeks on 2 and 9 March 1996. It spent ten weeks inside top ten left the Airplay Top 20 on 20 April 1996, after twelve weeks on the chart. It became Dion's highest charting song on the French Airplay Chart, beating "Je sais pas" (number two) and "Pour que tu m'aimes encore" (number three). "Le ballet" ranked as the sixth most economically profitable song of 1996 in France.

Formats and track listings
French promotional CD single
"Le ballet" – 4:26

Charts

References

1996 singles
1996 songs
Celine Dion songs
Columbia Records singles
French-language songs
Songs written by Jean-Jacques Goldman